Rangula Ratnam is a 1966 Indian Telugu-language film directed and produced by B. N. Reddy under the banner of Vauhini pictures. The film stars Chandra Mohan, Vanisri, Anjali Devi and Baby Rekha (in her on-screen debut). It is a social and political satire involving a middle-class family in the backdrop of politics and elections. The film won National Film Award for Best Feature Film in Telugu and also won two Nandi Awards. B. N. Reddy introduced many stalwarts like Chandra Mohan, Vanisri, Rekha and Vijaya Nirmala as young artistes to the film industry with this movie.

Plot
Though his forefathers are landlords, Sundara Ramayya is left with three acres of land. He sells that small bit of land and shifts along with his family to a nearby town in search of lively hood. He starts a small business but eventually can not get on with that as he fails to recollect dues from his customers. His ambition is to make his elder son Surya Chandra Rao an advocate and worries about his second son Vasu who is not good at studies. Vasu practices wrestling in the surrounding Sankara Rao Vyamasala and Sankara Rao encourages Vasu. Sundara Ramayya dies and his wife Sita takes care of the family. Suryam does not understand the financial problems of the family whereas Vasu comes to the rescue of his mother and takes care of her sister. Suryam finds an easy way to get rich and marries the daughter of a rich politician and abandons his family. Vasu believes in the common good for society. He falls in love with Sankara Rao's daughter, who is from another class in society.

Eventually, both brothers find themselves on the opposite sides while competing in the elections. During this struggle, family differences increase and their mother gets injured. The movie ends with the two brothers reconciling their differences.

Crew

Cast 
 Anjali Devi - mother Seetha
 Chandra Mohan - younger brother Vasu
 Ram Mohan - elder brother Surya Chandra Rao
 Vanisri - wife of Vasu, jimmi
 Sukanya - wife of Suryam, Vanaja
 Vijaya Nirmala - sister Jaya
 Ramana Reddy - municipal chairman Appalasamy
 Pushpavalli - wife of Appalasamy
 Thyagaraju 
 Baby Bhanurekha (Rekha) - Tyagaraju's daughter
 Vijayasree

Soundtrack 
Many of the songs were successful melodies. They were in four classes, devotional used as prayers in a middle-class family, sad songs amid hardships, romantic songs, and patriotic and social songs in the elections background.

Accolades
Nandi Awards - 1966
Best Feature Film - Gold - B. N. Reddy 
Best Story Writer - Palagummi Padmaraju.

References

External links
 

1966 films
1960s Telugu-language films
Nandi Award winners
Best Telugu Feature Film National Film Award winners
Films directed by B. N. Reddy